Centrium may refer to:

Peavey Mart Centrium, Red Deer, Canada
The Centrium, Hong Kong
Television House, formerly The Centrium, London, England